Transgender literature is a collective term used to designate the literary production that addresses, has been written by or portrays people of diverse gender identity.

History 
Representations in literature of transgender people have existed for millennia, with the earliest instance probably being the book Metamorphoses, by the Roman poet Ovid. In the twentieth century its notable the novel Orlando (1928), by Virginia Woolf, considered one of the first transgender novels in English and whose plot follows a bisexual poet that changes gender from male to female and lives for hundreds of years.

For decades, publications that covered transgender topics were mainly centered on memoirs, with a lengthy tradition that had its earliest example in Man into Woman (1933), by Lili Elbe, and that has lasted until the present times with autobiographical books like The Secrets of My Life (2017), by Caitlyn Jenner. Other memoirs written by trans people that have amassed critical success are: Gender Outlaw (1994), by Kate Bornstein; Man Enough to be a Woman (1996), by Jayne County; Redefining Realness (2014), by Janet Mock; among others.

Nonetheless, apart from Orlando, the twentieth century saw the appearance of other fiction works with transgender characters that saw commercial success. Among them is Myra Breckinridge (1968), a satirical novel written by Gore Vidal that follows a trans woman hellbent on world domination and bringing down patriarchy. The book sold more than two million copies after publication, but was panned by critics.

The emergence of transgender literature as a distinct branch of LGBT literature took place in the 2010s, when the number of fiction works focused on the topic saw a pronounced growth and diversification, which was accompanied by a greater academic and general interest in the area and a process of differentiation with the rest of LGBT literature. This gave rise to a trend that saw more books being written by transgender authors whose main intended audience were transgender people.

In 2020, Dutch-born Marieke Lucas Rijneveld, who is non-binary, won the International Booker Prize with his novel The Discomfort of Evening.

In Spanish 

Among the best known works of Spanish trans literature are: Hell Has No Limits, a novel by José Donoso published in 1966 whose protagonist is Manuela, a trans woman who lives with her daughter in a deteriorated town called El Olivo; Cobra (1972), by Cuban writer Severo Sarduy, that uses an experimental narration to tell the story of a transvestite who wants to transform her body; and Kiss of the Spider Woman (1976), a novel by Manuel Puig in which a young revolutionary called Valentín shares a cell with Molina, who is presented as a gay man but who during their conversations implies that his identity might be of a transgender woman, as its shown in the next passage:

In recent years, many books in Spanish with transgender protagonists have garnered commercial and critical success. In Argentina, one of the most famous examples is Las malas (2019), by Camila Sosa Villada, which won the prestigious Sor Juana Inés de la Cruz Prize. The novel, inspired by the youth of the author where she narrates the lives of a group of transgender prostitutes working in the city of Córdoba, became a critical and commercial sensation, with more than eight editions in Argentina alone and translations to many languages in the first year of publication. From recent Ecuadorian literature, one example is Gabriel(a) (2019), by Raúl Vallejo Corral, a novel which won the Miguel Donoso Pareja Prize with the story of a transgender woman that falls in love with an executive and faces a discriminatory society in her attempt to become a journalist.

In children's literature
According to a 2015 NPR story, hundreds of books featuring transgender characters have been published since 2000. Although a vast majority of them tend to be targeted to a teenage audience, these publications also consist of picture books for younger children.

Transgender teenage girl Jazz Jennings co-authored a 2014 children's book called I Am Jazz about her experience discovering her identity. Scholastic Books published Alex Gino's George in 2015, about a transgender girl, Melissa, who everyone else knows as George. Unable to find books with transgender characters to explain her father's transition to her children, Australian author Jess Walton created the 2016 children's book Introducing Teddy with illustrator Dougal MacPherson to assist children in understanding gender fluidity. Additional books listed by The Horn Book Magazine include:
George (2012) by Alex Gino
Red: A Crayon's Story (2015) by Michael Hall
The Other Boy (2016) by M. G. Hennessey
Lily and Dunkin (2016) by Donna Gephart
Alex as Well (2015) by Alyssa Brugman
 Jess, Chunk, and the Road Trip to Infinity (2016) by Kristin Elizabeth Clark
Look Past (2016) by Eric Devine
If I Was Your Girl (2016) by Meredith Russo
Lizard Radio (2015) by Pat Schmatz
Beast (2016) by Brie Spangler
The Art of Being Normal (2016) by Lisa Williamson

In the past few years, transgender women have been finding publishers for their own picture books written for transgender kids. Some of these books include:

A Princess of Great Daring (2015) written by Tobi Hill-Meyer, illustrated by Elenore Toczynski 
Super Power Baby Shower (2017) written by Tobi Hill-Meyer and Fay Onyx, illustrated by Janine Carrington
He wants to be a princess (2019) written and illustrated by Nicky Brookes
From the Stars in the Sky to the Fish in the Sea (2017) written by Kai Cheng Thom, illustrated by Kai Yun Ching & Wai-Yant Li
The Girl from the Stars (2016) written and illustrated by Amy Heart
The Sisters from the Stars (2018) written and illustrated by Amy Heart

See also 
 List of transgender publications
 Gay literature
 Lesbian literature

References

External links 
 List of literature with transgender themes